Doueugui Jean-Marie Mala (born December 20, 1993) is an Ivorian footballer who plays for F.C. Kafr Qasim in the Israeli National League.

Career
Mala signed with United Soccer League side Phoenix Rising FC from Williamsville Athletic Club on 10 August 2017.

In February 2020, Mala joined Oakland Roots SC.

References

External links
 
 USL Profile

1993 births
Living people
Ivorian footballers
Williamsville Athletic Club players
Phoenix Rising FC players
Oakland Roots SC players
F.C. Kafr Qasim players
USL Championship players
Liga Leumit players
Ivorian expatriate footballers
Expatriate soccer players in the United States
Expatriate footballers in Israel
Ivorian expatriate sportspeople in the United States
Ivorian expatriate sportspeople in Israel
Association football defenders